Chapel-le-Dale is a hamlet in the civil parish of Ingleton, North Yorkshire, England. It is in the Yorkshire Dales and was previously in the West Riding of Yorkshire.

History
The hamlet is situated on the B6255 road between Ingleton and Ribblehead near to the Ribblehead Viaduct. The name derives from Old French and literally means Chapel in the valley. It was first recorded as Chappell ith Dale in 1677. Historically, the hamlet, and its parish, were both in the Wapentake of Ewcross and up until 1974, they were in the West Riding of Yorkshire.

The hamlet is in close proximity to Ingleborough and Whernside and there are several potholes in the vicinity, the best known being Great Douk Cave. There is a pub in the village, The Old Hill Inn, which is used as a starting and ending point for various walks on Whernside or Ingleborough. The source of the River Doe is nearby.

There is a church in the hamlet (The Church of St Leonard) which is now a grade II listed building. It was used as a burial plot for the navvies, and their family members, who died whilst constructing the nearby Ribblehead Viaduct between 1869 and 1876. In all, over 200 people died during the construction from accidents and outbreaks of smallpox. A plaque was erected in the church to their memory.

References

External links

Chapel-le-Dale

Hamlets in North Yorkshire